Parmentier were a short-lived electronic music band from New Zealand, based in Australia. It was founded in 1996 by Rosy Parlane and Dion Workman (two ex-members of the trio Thela). They toured, then released two albums in 1998.

Discography

External links
 An interview with Parmentier from Bananafish magazine
 [ Discography of Parmentier] at AMG
 Discography of Parmentier at Discogs

New Zealand electronic music groups